Yasutoshi Yukawa (born 1941 - 25.8.2014) was a Japanese linguist who contributed to African and Tibetan linguistics. In 2006 his students and colleagues honoured his work with a Festschrift<ref>言語研究の射程: 湯川恭敏先生記念論集 Gengo kenkyū no shatei: Yukawa Yasutoshi Sensei kinen ronshū.' Tokyo: Hitsuji Shobō, 2006.</ref>

Yasutoshi Yukawa's initial research interest was Theoretical Linguistics, especially syntax and semantics (1950s-60s). During the 1960s and 1970s he published several important papers on Lhasa dialect of Tibetan. He began work on African linguistic in 1975. His main contribution is description of Bantu languages, their genetic classification and tone systems.

References
Yukawa Yasutoshi 湯川恭敏 (1966). “チベット語のduuの意味 Chibettogo no duu no imi [The meaning of Tibetan duu].” 言語研究 Gengo Kenkyū 49: 77-84.
Yukawa Yasutoshi 湯川恭敏 (1971) "チベット語の述部の輪郭 Chibettogo no jutsubu no rinkaku [Outline of Tibetan Predicates]" 言語学の基本問題 Gengogaku no kihon mondai / Basic problems in linguistics. Tokyo: 大修館書店 Taishūkan Shoten. 178-204.
Yukawa Yasutoshi 湯川恭敏 (1975) チベット語の述語 Chibettogo no jutsugo [The Predicates of Tibetan] アジア・アフリカ文法硏究 Ajia Afurika bunpō kenkyū / Asian & African Linguistics. 4: 1-14. Tokyo: ILCAA. (Published as "Lhasa Tibetan predicates." Evidential Systems of Tibetan Languages (pp. 187–224). Berlin: De Gruyter.)
Yukawa Yasutoshi 湯川恭敏 (1987). A Classified vocabulary of the Nkoya language. Tokyo: Institute for the study of languages and cultures of Asia and Africa.
Yukawa Yasutoshi 湯川恭敏 (1987). A classified vocabulary of the Mwenyi language. Tokyo: Institute for the Study of Languages and Cultures of Asia and Africa.
Yukawa Yasutoshi 湯川恭敏 (1989). A classified vocabulary of the Nilamba language. Tokyo: Institute for the Study of Languages and Cultures of Asia and Africa.
Yukawa Yasutoshi 湯川恭敏 (1992). Studies in Cameroonian and Zairean languages. Tokyo: Research Institute for Languages and Cultures of Asia and Africa (ILCAA), Tokyo University of Foreign Studies.
Yukawa Yasutoshi 湯川恭敏  (1995)『バントゥ諸語動詞アクセントの研究』 ひつじ書房, 1995
Yukawa Yasutoshi 湯川恭敏 (1999)『言語学』 ひつじ書房, 1999
Yukawa Yasutoshi 湯川恭敏 (2006). A classified vocabulary of the Punu language.'' Tokyo: Research Institute for Languages and Cultures of Asia and Africa (ILCAA), Tokyo University of Foreign Studies.
Yukawa Yasutoshi 湯川恭敏 (2011).『バントゥ諸語分岐史の研究』 ひつじ書房, 2011

1941 births
Tibetologists
2014 deaths